In enzymology, a phenacrylate decarboxylase is an enzyme that catalyzes the chemical reaction

4-coumarate  4-vinylphenol + 2 CO2

Hence, this enzyme has one substrate, 4-coumarate, and two products, 4-vinylphenol and carbon dioxide.

This enzyme belongs to the family of lyases, specifically the carboxy-lyases, which cleave carbon-carbon bonds. The systematic name of this enzyme class is 3-phenylprop-2-enoate carboxy-lyase. Other names in common use include ferulic acid decarboxylase, and phenolic acid decarboxylase.  It employs a prenylated flavin cofactor.

References

 
 

EC 4.1.1